Jongilizwe College was a school in Tsolo, Transkei (now Eastern Cape), South Africa which served the sons of Chiefs and Headmen from the Transkei bantustan.

Alumni
 Bantu Holomisa (1975)
 Stanley Ntapane (1979)
 Dumisa Ntsebeza (1975)

References

Schools in the Eastern Cape
Transkei